The International Islamic College (IIC) (Arabic:الكلية لإسلامية العالمية) is a private college located in Taman Batu Muda, Selangor, Malaysia. The college was established in 2000 as a private higher education institution. International Islamic College is one of the private higher education institutions in Malaysia.

The campus
The first campus of International Islamic College was at the 4th miles, Jalan Gombak, opposite of the Saad Abi Waqqas mosque. In April 2005, they moved to the current complex at Jalan 31/10A, Taman Batu Muda, Selangor. The neighboring academic institution at the area are the Kolej Unikop and Pusrawi International College of Medical Science (PICOM). The new complex is bigger and can accommodate more students.

Board of directors
Chairman
 Mohd Khair Ngadiron

Members
 Prof. Dr. Ahmad Faris Ismail
 Zaidi Abd. Ghani

Schools and center
International Islamic College consisted of four schools and one center. They are as follows:
 School of Information and Communication Technology (SICT)
 School of Social Sciences (SOSS)
 School of Management (SOM)
 School of Foundation and Undergraduate (SFU)
 Center For Languages (CEL)

Courses offered
Currently the International Islamic College offers one foundation course, 3 certificate level courses, 13 diploma level courses and 3 collaborative degree courses.

Foundations
 Foundation in Arts

Certificate programmes
 Certificate in Business Administration (CBA)
 Certificate in Early Childhood Education (CCE)
 Certificate in English (CPE)

Diploma programmes
 Diploma in Computer Science (DCS)
 Diploma in Information Technology (DIT)
 Diploma in Creative Animation (DCA)
 Diploma in Graphic Design (DGD)
 Diploma in Business Administration (DBA)  
 Diploma in Accounting (DIA)
 Diploma in Office Management and Secretaryship (DMS)
 Diploma in Islamic Banking and Finance (DBF)
 Diploma in Enforcement Management (DEM)
 Diploma in Marketing Management (DMM)
 Diploma in Risk Management (DRM)
 Diploma in Islamic Early Childhood Education (DCE)
 Diploma in Contemporary Islamic Sciences (DIC)
 Diploma in Halal Industry Management (DHM)

Collaborative degree courses
 Bachelor of Business (Entrepreneurship) 3+0 in collaboration with Federation University, Australia
 Bachelor of Commerce (Accounting) 3+0 in collaboration with Federation University, Australia
 BA (Hons) Early Childhood Studies (International) 3+0 in collaboration with Teesside University, United Kingdom

Colleges in Malaysia
Universities and colleges in Kuala Lumpur
Educational institutions established in 2000
2000 establishments in Malaysia